Arackappady is a village in the Ernakulam district of Kerala, India. It is located in the Kunnathunad taluk.

Demographics 

According to the 2011 census of India, Arakapady has 4213 households. The literacy rate of the village is 84.1%.

References 

Villages in Kunnathunad taluk